(Spanish, 'Tell me how it happened') is an Argentine television series broadcast by Televisión Pública Argentina. The series premiered on August 21, 2017 and ended on December 21, 2017.

Development
The series is an adaptation of Cuéntame cómo pasó, a Spanish series by Televisión Española starring Imanol Arias and Ana Duato.

The series was broadcast in prime-time from Monday to Thursday and interspersed the most important historical facts of Argentina with the comings and goings of a family settled in the suburbs of Buenos Aires. The narration mixed documentary images from the historical archive of the channel with scenes performed by the actors, between 1974 and 1983.

Cast and characters

Martínez Family

Episodes

Data sheet 
 A Production From: Argentine Public Television
 Authors: Marisa Grinstein - Liliana Escliar
 Lighting: Ezequiel Perazzo - Gustavo Nakamura
 Sound: Mariano Mabras - Octavio Morelli
 Scenography: Pablo Meireles
 Atmosphere: Tomas Garrahan - Paola Giai
 Costumes: Ana Markarián
 Colorists: Nicolás Rada - Antonio Marco
 General Production: Patricia Moser - Gustavo Villamagna
 Assistant Directors: Daniel Mautone - Mariela Osorio
 Sound post-production: Diego Mustica - Adrián Barnes - Federico Alegre
 Edition and Musicalization: Alejandro Parysow - Santiago Parysow
 Production Team: Dinka Thorry - Victoria Pérez - Sebastián Pannucci
 Artistic Advisor: Andrea Stivel
 Direction: Jorge Bechara - Daniel Galimberti

Promotion 
The first promo was launched on July 26, 2017. On August 14, 2017, it made its presentation at the CCK.

References

External links 
 Official site
 Twitter account
 Internet Movie Database

Televisión Pública original programming
2017 Argentine television series debuts
2017 Argentine television series endings
2010s Argentine drama television series
Television series set in the 1970s
Television series set in the 1980s
Non-Spanish television series based on Spanish television series
Spanish-language television shows